The following highways are numbered 800:

Canada
Alberta Highway 800
 Highway 800 (Ontario) (former)

United States